The 1933 Appalachian State Mountaineers football team was an American football team that represented Appalachian State Teachers College (now known as Appalachian State University) as a member of the North State Conference during the 1933 college football season. In their first year under head coach Eugene Garbee, the Mountaineers compiled an overall record of 7–2, with a mark of 1–0 in conference play.

Schedule

References

Appalachian State
Appalachian State Mountaineers football seasons
Appalachian State Mountaineers football